John Fitzgerald and Anders Järryd were the defending champions, but lost in the semifinals this year.

John McEnroe and Patrick McEnroe won in the final 6–4, 6–2, against Patrick Galbraith and Danie Visser.

Seeds
All seeds receive a bye into the second round.

Draw

Finals

Top half

Bottom half

External links
 1993 Paris Open Doubles draw

1992 Paris Open
1992 ATP Tour